Patrick B. Harvey (born c. 1925) was a rugby union player who represented Australia.

Harvey, a number 8, was born in Brisbane, Queensland and claimed a total of 2 international rugby caps for Australia.

References

Australian rugby union players
Australia international rugby union players
Living people
Year of birth missing (living people)
Rugby union players from Brisbane
Rugby union number eights